California Flag is a thoroughbred racehorse, foaled at Hi Card Ranch on February 19, 2004. He is sired by Avenue of Flags, a son of Seattle Slew, out of the Afleet (a son of Mr. Prospector) mare Ultrafleet.

He is best known for setting a new turf course record in 2008 in the Morvich Handicap and the only horse to win this race three times - 2008, 2009 and 2011. On November 7, 2009, he got the most important win of his career beating Gotta Have Her in the Breeders' Cup Turf Sprint. California Flag then went to Hong Kong where he finished fifth in the Hong Kong Sprint. He then traveled to Dubai to contest in the new Al Quoz Sprint and he was third after just getting overtaken at the wire.

California Flag shared 2009 California Horse of the Year honors with Dancing in Silks.

References
California Flag's pedigree and racing stats

2004 racehorse births
Racehorses trained in the United States
Racehorses bred in California
Breeders' Cup Turf Sprint winners
Thoroughbred family 9-f